Riviera is a new municipality in the district of Riviera in the canton of Ticino in Switzerland. The municipalities of Osogna, Lodrino, Iragna and Cresciano merged on April 2, 2017.

History

On October 18, 2015 the citizens of Osogna, Lodrino, Iragna and Cresciano voted to merge their municipalities into the new municipality of Riviera as the name of their district. The merger was enacted by the Grand Council of Ticino. The election of the municipal council marked the beginning of the new municipality.

Geography

The municipality is located in the Riviera district south of Biasca and north of Bellinzona on both banks of the Ticino river. A recreation park is planned on these banks.

The rocks of the region consist mainly of gneisses and granites (some quarries are operated in Lodrino). The vegetation is composed primarily of deciduous trees (beeches, chestnut trees) up to about 900 m (3,000 ft) and then evergreen trees (spruces and larches). Chestnuts were an important food for the population.

Demographics

Historic population

The historical population is given in the following chart:

References

Municipalities of Ticino